Eva Lund Haugen (February 4, 1907 – October 25, 1996) was an American writer, editor and translator.

Biography
Eva Lund was born at Kongsvinger in Hedmark, Norway. She was twelve years old when her journalist parents emigrated to the United States in 1919. The family moved to Decorah, Iowa in 1927, where both parents worked for the Norwegian-American newspaper, Decorah-Posten. Her father, Einar Lund (18801963) was editor of the newspaper from 1946 to 1962.

She attended the University of Illinois in 19301931. She received her B.A. degree from the University of Wisconsin–Madison. In 1932, she married American linguist Einar Haugen with whom she was author, co-editor or translator of several books. Separately, she was author and translator of several published works relating to Norwegian-American heritage. She is most associated with her work as translator and editor in connection with works of  Norwegian writer and Nobel Prize laureate, Bjørnstjerne Bjørnson.

The Einar and Eva Lund Haugen Memorial Scholarship has been established to honor both Eva Lund Haugen and her husband, Einar Haugen.

Selected bibliography
 Land of the Free: Bjornstjerne Bjornson's America Letters (Norwegian American Historic Association., Northfield, MN. 1978)
 Peder Anderson of Bergen and Lowell : Artist and Ambassador of Culture (Norwegian-American Studies, Oslo 1973)
 Bibliography of Scandinavian Dictionaries  (Kraus International, White Plains, New York, March 1985)
 An Editor Chooses America: The Story of Einar Lund. (Norse Heritage Volume II, 58–72.  Norwegian Emigration Center, 1991)

References

External links
 Norway official site in the United States. Einar and Eva Lund Haugen Memorial Scholarship
 The Norwegian-American Historical Association. The Einar and Eva Haugen Memorial Scholarship 

1907 births
1996 deaths
People from Kongsvinger
People from Hedmark
American Lutherans
University of Illinois Urbana-Champaign alumni
University of Wisconsin–Madison alumni
Norwegian emigrants to the United States
Norwegian–English translators
20th-century translators
Scandinavian studies
20th-century Lutherans